Odell Lake is a small lake located north-northwest of Hobart in Delaware County, New York. It drains south via Lake Brook which flows into the West Branch Delaware River. Gunhouse Hill is located west of Odell Lake.

See also
 List of lakes in New York

References 

Lakes of New York (state)
Lakes of Delaware County, New York